324 E. 13th Street #7 is a compilation by composer and guitarist Roy Montgomery, released on 16 November 1999 through Drunken Fish Records.

Track listing

Personnel 
Adapted from the 324 E. 13th Street #7 liner notes.
Jessica Meyer – illustrations, design
Roy Montgomery – vocals, guitar, keyboards, mixing, photography

Release history

References

External links 
 

1999 compilation albums
Roy Montgomery albums
Drunken Fish Records compilation albums